The 2023 Bremen state election  will be held on 14 May 2023 to elect the 21st Bürgerschaft of Bremen. Elections to the city councils of Bremen and Bremerhaven, the two municipal entities comprising the state of Bremen, will be held simultaneously. The incumbent government is a coalition of the Social Democratic Party (SPD), Alliance 90/The Greens, and The Left led by Mayor Andreas Bovenschulte.

Election date and electoral system
According to Bremen state constitution, the Bürgerschaft has a term of four years, and elections must take place on a Sunday or public holiday during the last month of the previous term. Bremen is the only German state whose parliament sits for a four-year term; all others have terms of five years. The previous election took place on 26 May 2019, and the date for the 2023 election was set for 14 May.

The Bürgerschaft is elected via open party-list proportional representation in two multi-member constituencies corresponding to the two parts of the state: the city of Bremen and the city of Bremerhaven. A five percent electoral threshold is applied independently in both areas. 72 members are elected in Bremen and 15 in Bremerhaven, for a total of 87 seats in the Bürgerschaft. Seat distribution is calculated using the Sainte-Laguë method. Voters each have five votes which may be distributed between party lists and the candidates within them; voters may cast multiple votes for a single candidate or list (panachage with cumulative voting). In Bremen (but not Bremerhaven), the same ballot is also used to elect the city council, also consisting of 72 members elected from the same pool of parties and candidates.

All German citizens aged 16 years or older who have lived in Bremen for at least three months are eligible to vote. Additionally, EU citizens residing in the city of Bremen and meeting the same requirements may vote, but their votes only count toward the Bremen city council election, not the state Bürgerschaft. Due to this, results for the Bremen city council may vary slightly from the state election results.

Background

In the previous election held on 26 May 2019, the CDU became the largest party in the Bürgerschaft for the first time in post-war history, winning 26.7%. The SPD, which has governed the state continuously since the Second World War, was reduced to second place on 24.9%, a record low for the party and down eight percentage points from the 2015 election. The Greens and Left both improved modestly, taking 17% and 11% respectively, while the AfD and FDP won 6% each with slight losses. Citizens in Rage (BiW) retained its single seat in Bremerhaven.

The previous governing coalition of the SPD and Greens lost its majority in the election. Despite the CDU achieving a plurality, the Bürgerschaft retained an overall left-wing majority of the SPD, Greens, and Left. The three parties subsequently formed a coalition government under new mayor Andreas Bovenschulte, marking the first time The Left had entered government in a western state.

Parties
The table below lists parties represented in the previous Bürgerschaft of Bremen.

Opinion polling

Party polling

Mayor polling

References 

Elections in Bremen (state)
2023 elections in Germany
Future elections in Germany